Gurab Zarmikh Rural District is a rural district (dehestan) in Mirza Kuchek Janghli District, Sowme'eh Sara County, Gilan Province, Iran. At the 2006 census, its population was 15,672, in 3,919 families. The rural district has 14 villages.

References 

Rural Districts of Gilan Province
Sowme'eh Sara County